Phyllis Jean Stabeno is a physical oceanographer known for her research on the movement of water in polar regions. She has led award-winning research projects in the Arctic and was noted for a distinguished scientific career by the National Oceanic and Atmospheric Administration.

Education and career 
Stabeno received her Ph.D. in 1982 from Oregon State University. As of 2021, she works at the National Oceanic and Atmospheric Administration (NOAA) within the Pacific Marine Environmental Laboratory.

Research 
Stabeno is known for her research on the water masses of the Arctic, long-term changes in the movement of water in the region, and the implications of these changes in the face of global climate change. Her early research examined currents off California and Oregon. She used current data from moorings and buoys that were tracked by satellites to characterize the movement of water in the vicinity of Kodiak Island, Alaska. She subsequently expanded to using satellite-tracked buoys to examine water movement in the Bering Sea, and conducted studies on the changes in the water movement in the region, especially in response to climate change. She has used moorings deployed on the continental shelf to track the Alaska Coastal Current and followed the movement of eggs and larvae from walleye pollock. Her work includes investigations into the Gulf of Alaska, the region near select Aleutian Islands, and the North Pacific Ocean. In the Bering Sea, her research has revealed warming of waters on the Bering Sea shelf, the physical oceanography of the Bering Sea, and an integration of data from the Bering Sea that spans multiple decades.

Selected publications

Awards and honors 
Stabeno was the lead investigator for the Bering Ecosystem Study (BEST) and Bering Sea Integrated Ecosystem Research Plan (BSIERP) programs which won the Department of Commerce Gold Medal in 2015.  In 2019 she received a Distinguished Career Award in Scientific Achievement from NOAA.

References

External links 

 May 16, 2019

Oregon State University alumni
National Oceanic and Atmospheric Administration personnel
Women oceanographers
American physicists
Women physicists
Year of birth missing (living people)
Living people